Nagasaki-e is a genre of ukiyo-e woodblock prints, produced in Nagasaki during the Edo period, that depict the port city of Nagasaki, the Dutch and Chinese who frequented it, and other foreign curiosities such as exotic fauna and Dutch and Chinese ships. They were mostly produced for merchants who traveled to Japan on business. Japanese people also bought such prints as they were curious about foreigners, with whom they couldn't meet themselves. Nagasaki-e print were also sold in Edo, Osaka, and provinces. Nagasaki was the only port that foreigners were allowed to visit in Tokugawa time, between 1641 and 1859.

Technically, Nagasaki-e print were made on paper of inferior quality, with "earlier examples were made with gasenshi, a Chinese-style paper containing tan tree fibers (Pteroceltis tatarinowii maxim), rice-straw, and bleached bamboo. Sometimes, printers rubbed the colorants into the papers with horizontal or vertical strokes rather than the traditional circular motions used in nishiki-e." The first nagasaki-e prints were made in the late 1720s. "The range of subject matter was wide, including foreign couples, children, families, pets, exotic birds and animals, female beauties, courtesans, landscapes, cityscapes, ships, maps, and military events." Style was similar to that of Chinese nenga (年画).

Production of these souvenir prints "grew out of an earlier map-making industry". Several publishing houses produced the prints, among them Hariya (針屋), Toshimaya (豊島屋), Yamatoya (大和屋), and Bunkindō (文錦堂). For most publishers nagasaki-e wasn't their main business. One of the first examples of nagasaki-e prints were panoramic maps of the city, that were very popular and were printed for many years without any change.

Most prints are anonymous, probably because the majority of authors were amateurs "who worked in foreign-trade positions in Nagasaki". One of the best-known authors is Kawahara Keiga, who had access to many Dutch paintings with the help of Franz von Siebold, who worked for the Dutch government at the Nagasaki port.

Gallery

Further reading 

Chaiklin, Martha: "Off the block: A new look at the origins of Nagasaki prints," in: Andon no. 66. Leiden: Society for Japanese Arts, July 2000, pp. 13–17.
Frédéric, Louis: Japan Encyclopedia. Cambridge, MA: Harvard University Press, 2002 (reprint of 1996 ed.), p. 504.
French, Cal: "Views from the Port: Souvenir Prints of Nagasaki," in: Through Closed Doors: Western Influence on Japanese Art 1639–1853. Kobe City Museum of Namban Art, 1977, Chapter 2, pp. 31–57.
French, Cal: "More Views from the Port: Professional Painters of Nagasaki," in: Through Closed Doors: Western Influence on Japanese Art 1639–1853. Kobe City Museum of Namban Art, 1977, Chapter 3, pp. 59–94.
Hillier, Jack: The Art of the Japanese Book. London: Sotheby's, 1987, pp. 512–513 and no. 333.
Hosono, Masunobu: Nagasaki Prints and Early Copper Plates. Tokyo/New York: Kodansha, 1978.
Kakudo, Yoshikô: Nagasaki and Yokohama Prints from the Richard Gump Collection. Asian Art Museum of San Francisco, 1981, nos. 1–3.
Mody, N.: A Collection of Nagasaki Colour Prints and Paintings Showing the Influence of Chinese and European Art on that of Japan. Rutland, VT: Tuttle, 1969 (new edition after orig. 1939 ed.).
Reigle Newland, Amy (ed.), The Hotei Encyclopedia of Japanese Woodblock Prints. Amsterdam: Hotei Publishing, 2005, vol. 1, pp. 225–228 and vol. 2, p. 471 (articles by M. Chaiklin).
Tanaka, Atsushi: Nagasaki-kei yôfû-ga ("Nagasaki western-style painting": 長崎系洋風画), in: Yôfû hyôgen no dônyû (Development of Western Realism in Japan: 洋風表現の導入). Torû Asano, Masaaaki Ozaki, and Atsushi Tanaka (eds.). National Museum of Modern Art, Tokyo, 1985, pp. 144–163.

References 

Ukiyo-e genres